Artificial Svensson (Swedish: Konstgjorda Svensson) is a 1929 Swedish silent comedy film directed by Gustaf Edgren and starring Fridolf Rhudin, Brita Appelgren and  Weyler Hildebrand. It was shot at the Råsunda Studios in Stockholm. The film's sets were designed by the art director Vilhelm Bryde.

Cast
 Fridolf Rhudin as 	Fridolf Ambrosius Svensson
 Brita Appelgren as 	Mary Lantz
 Weyler Hildebrand as 	Sgt.Mayor Göransson
 Karin Gillberg as 	Mary Björklund
 Sven Garbo as 	Harald Smith
 Georg Blomstedt as 	Col. Björklund
 Tor Borong as 	Col. Claes Gyllenbage
 Ernst Brunman as 	Doctor
 Einar Fagstad as 	Conscript
 Richard Lund as 	Lieutenant
 Olof Ås as 	Officer
 Alf Östlund as	Private
 Bertil Ehrenmark as 	Soldat 
 Louise Eneman-Wahlberg as Frun som blir skrämd 
 Olle Hilding as 	Soldat 
 Carlo Hultman as 	Soldat utanför läkarmottagningen 
 Maja Jerlström as 	Hembiträdet 
 Robert Jonsson as 	Inskrivningsofficer 
 Ludde Juberg as Sjukvårdare 
 Eric Malmberg as 	Inskrivningsofficer 
 Greta Strömberg as 	Dansande på restaurangen 
 Maya Strömberg as Dansande på restaurangen 
 Åke Uppström as 	Soldat på marketenteriet 
 John Wahlbom as Soldat på marketenteriet 
 Harald Wehlnor as 	Underofficer 
 Ruth Weijden as 	Smiths hembiträde

References

Bibliography
 Gustafsson, Tommy. Masculinity in the Golden Age of Swedish Cinema: A Cultural Analysis of 1920s Films. McFarland, 2014.

External links

1929 films
1929 comedy films
Swedish comedy films
Swedish silent feature films
Swedish black-and-white films
Films directed by Gustaf Edgren
1920s Swedish-language films
Silent comedy films
1920s Swedish films